This is the comprehensive listing of releases by Japanese pop-punk band Shonen Knife.

Albums

Studio albums

EPs

Live albums
 (1991) We Are Very Happy You Came – live mini-album
 (2001) Power of Money – Burning Farm: BF-2CT) – rare cassette only album with Mana Nishiura
 (2006) Live in Osaka – The first completely live album by Shonen Knife
 (2010) "Live at Mohawk Place DVD" – Recorded live in Buffalo, NY on their North American "SuperGroup" Tour 2009
 (2015) Osaka Ramones Live – Naoko/Ritsuke/Emi with special guest CJ Ramone – produced by Good Charamel Records and TOMATO HEAD – Recorded live at The Bellhouse, Brooklyn, NY 18-Nov-2011 – limited 500 CD pressing
 (2018) Alive! In Osaka –  recorded live at Juso Fandango in Osaka, Japan in December 2017, 21 tracks. DVD/CD package.

Compilations
 (1990) Shonen Knife – Compilation of first two albums
 (1995) Greatest History – Compilation only available in Japan
 (1996) The Birds & The B-Sides – collection of B-sides and outtakes
 (2000) Millennium Edition – compilation of material from 1996–1999 plus three unreleased versions of songs from Strawberry Sound
 (2006) Universal Hits-Golden Best – Two-disc compilation

Remix albums
 (1997) Super Mix – compilation of remixes
 (1999) Ultra Mix – compilation of remixes

Other
 (1987) Flipside Vinyl Fanzine vol. 3 – punk compilation features the song Cycling is Fun
 (1990) Rutles Highway Revisited – (tribute album to The Rutles) – features studio cover version of "Goose Step Mama"
 (1994) If I Were a Carpenter – tribute album to The Carpenters featured a cover of Top of the World
 (1997) Mint Sound Greatest Hits Volume One – compilation features the song Flying Jelly Attack
 (2000) The Powerpuff Girls Heroes and Villains – contributed the song Buttercup (I'm a Super Girl)
 (2011) Take It or Leave It – A Tribute to the Queens of Noise: The Runaways – compilation features cover of "Black Leather"
 (2013) Yellow Loveless – cover of "When You Sleep" on tribute album to My Bloody Valentine's Loveless.

Singles

References

External links
Official Shonen Knife Discography 
Official Shonen Knife Discography
Official Shonen Knife Biography

Discographies of Japanese artists
Pop punk group discographies